Space Camp Turkey is located in the Aegean Free Zone, a high-tech industrial park in Gaziemir metropolitan district of Izmir, Turkey, operated by ESBAS the Aegean Free Zone Development and Operating Company. Izmir is a Mediterranean city on the western coast of Turkey with a population of over 4 million people. Space Camp Turkey is one of three space camps in the world, and one of two in Asia. It is affiliated with the United States Space & Rocket Center in Huntsville, Alabama.

Kaya Tuncer, president of ESBAS, established a Space Camp in Turkey after visiting Huntsville with his Turkish friend Ismail Akbay, an Apollo Project Engineer who worked for Dr. Wernher von Braun. Space Camp Turkey opened on 12 June 2000. American astronaut Scott Carpenter and Ismail Akbay were honored guests at the ceremony.  
 
Space Camp Turkey has hosted over 160,000 children and adults from 50 countries and developed space science-related programs that consist of 2-Day Outer Space Adventure during the school year, 5-Day Space Camp and 5-Day Space Camp with Robotics during semester breaks, and 6-Day International Summer Camp with robotic class option.

International credentials
Space Camp Turkey is recognized as a science institution by the Turkish Ministry of Education. It is also licensed with the Alabama Space Science Exhibit Commission, the governing body of the U.S. Space and Rocket Center. Space Camp Turkey is a member of the following school organizations: 
 Near East South Asia Council of Overseas Schools (NESA)
 Central and Eastern European Schools Association (CEESA)
 European Council of International Schools (ECIS)
 East Asia Regional Council of Overseas Schools (EARCOS)

See also 
 Gaziemir
 İzmir

External links 

Official Website for Space Camp Turkey Programs
Official Website for Global Friendship Through Space Education Foundation

İzmir
Space organizations
Turkey
Tourism in Turkey
Turkish children
Education in Turkey
Tourist attractions in İzmir